This is a list of pistols. The list covers manually operated and semi-automatic/machine pistols:

See also
List of firearms
List of assault rifles
List of machine guns
List of multiple-barrel firearms
List of revolvers
List of semi-automatic pistols
List of shotguns
List of sniper rifles
List of submachine guns

References
Citations

Bibliography
 World Guns
Terry Gander Guns Recognition Guide, May 2005, 
David Miller Illustrated Directory of 20th Century Guns, June 2003, 
Richard D. Jones Jane's Gun Recognition Guide'', June 2008, 

Pistols